Mealy may refer to:

 Mealy Mountains, Newfoundland and Labrador, Canada
 Mealy Mountains National Park Reserve
 Darlene Mealy (active from 2006), American politician in New York City
 Dean Mealy (1915-1973), American basketball player.
 E. Mealy El (born Edward Mealy, 1870-1935), American religious leader
 George H. Mealy (1927-2010), American mathematician and computer scientist
 Mealy machine, invented by George H. Mealy
 Robert Mealy (active from 2004), American performer and teacher of baroque violin

See also
 Mealie, another name for maize